Beyond the Glimpse of Dreams is the debut album by Indonesian extreme metal band Kekal released in 1998. Vocalist Harry left the band after the album's release.

Recording
The music on the album features extremely fast melodic black metal mixed with classic and thrash metal, and incorporates a range of vocal styles such as high pitched black metal shrieks, death growls, and female singing. Recorded on 16-track analog tape in April and December 1997 as two separate sessions, the album was originally released as a cassette by THT Productions in January 1998. Later in October 1998, Sonic Wave and Candlelight Productions re-released the album as CD and cassette with a different cover artwork. It went to sell 5000 copies total until being completely sold out in 2002. The album was re-mastered and re-issued in June, 2014.

Track listing

Personnel
Harry – vocals
Leo – guitar, vocal narration
Jeff – guitar, vocals
Azhar – bass, vocals
Julie, Hana & Vera – female vocals
The Black Machine – drums
Jeff, Habil & Leo – keyboards
Habil Kurnia & Denny Andreas – engineering & mixing

References

External links
Album at Metal Archives

1998 albums
Kekal albums
Thrash metal albums